Q-Feel was a British synthpop group.  They released their self-titled album in 1982, which included their only hit single, "Dancing in Heaven (Orbital Be-Bop)". It was an entry in the 1982 A Song for Europe, the UK's pre-selection for the Eurovision Song Contest. It finished sixth (out of eight) behind eventual winners Bardo. The outfit remains a one-hit wonder.

In popular culture
The song "Dancing in Heaven (Orbital Be-Bop)" was featured in the 1985 dance film, Girls Just Want to Have Fun, and the opening sequence of the 2007 retro comedy, Kickin' It Old Skool. Thanks to its presence in Girls Just Want to Have Fun, the song gained significant exposure in Los Angeles, where Top 40 radio station 102.7 KIIS-FM championed the record, making it one of their most-played songs at the time of the film's release.<ref>Radio & Records newspaper, 1985 archives</ref> 

After break-up
Group frontman Martin Page went on to achieve success as a songwriter and solo artist. He has frequently collaborated with fellow Q-Feel alumnus Brian Fairweather on songwriting and performing with other musicians. Page's debut solo album, 1994's In the House of Stone and Light featured contributions from Fairweather and fellow former Q-Feel bandmate, Trevor Thornton.

Personnel
Martin Page – bass, vocals
Brian Fairweather – guitar, vocals
Trevor Thornton – drums
Chris Richardson – keyboards, background vocals

Studio personnel
 Nigel Green - recording engineer 
  Mike Shipley - recording engineer
  Peter Harris - drum programming 
  Matt Wallis - assistant engineer 
  John Kongos - Fairlight CMI synthesizer programming

Discography
AlbumsQ-Feel'' (Jive, 1982)

Track listing

Singles
"Doctor on the Radio" (1981)
"Dancing in Heaven (Orbital Be-Bop)" (1982)
"Crosstalk" (1982) (promo only)
"Heroes Never Die" (1984)
"Dancing in Heaven (Orbital Be-Bop)" (1989) (reissue)

Charts

Singles

References

External links

English electronic music groups
English new wave musical groups
English synth-pop groups
Musical groups established in 1981
Musical groups disestablished in 1984
British hi-NRG groups
British synth-pop new wave groups
Jive Records artists